Spartak is the name of Spartacus in many Slavic languages and languages of other post-Soviet states. It may refer to:

In sports
Spartak (sports society), an international fitness and sports society that unites some countries of the former Soviet Union

In Russia
FC Spartak Moscow, a football club
FC Spartak Kostroma, a football club
PFC Spartak Nalchik, a football club
FC Spartak Vladikavkaz, a football club
HC Spartak Moscow, an ice hockey team
Spartak Saint Petersburg, a basketball team
Spartak Tennis Club, a tennis training facility
WBC Spartak Moscow, a women's basketball team

In Ukraine
Spartak (Ukraine), a physical culture and multi-sport club
Spartak Ivano-Frankivsk, a football team
FC Spartak Sumy, a football club
Zakarpattia Uzhhorod, a football club, formerly known as Spartak Uzhhorod

In Bulgaria
PFC Spartak Varna, a football team
PFC Spartak Pleven, a football team
FC Spartak Plovdiv, a football team
Spartak Sofia, a former football team

In Serbia
FK Spartak Ljig, a football club
FK Spartak Subotica, a football team
FK Radnički (disambiguation), several teams

In Slovakia
FC Spartak Trnava, a football team
TJ Spartak Myjava, a football team
FK Spartak Vráble, a football team
FK Spartak Bánovce nad Bebravou, a football team

In other countries
Spartak Stadium (disambiguation)
Barnt Green Spartak F.C., an English football team
Bristol Spartak F.C., an English football team
Spartak (Cape Verde), a Cape Verdean football team
FC Spartak Semey, a Kazakh football team
Budapesti Spartacus, a Hungarian sports club
  Spartak Gringley, a consistently successful fantasy football team, particularly in The Golden Boot Game
 Spartak FC founded 1994 and one time member of BP Berkhamstead Sunday League playing in Div 6, Divisional Cup runners up 1999.

Places
Spartak, Yasynuvata Raion, a village in Donetsk Oblast
Spartak, Kyrgyzstan, a village in Chuy Province, Kyrgyzstan

Other uses
Spartak (Moscow Metro), a station of Moscow Metro
Spartacus (ballet), by Aram Khachaturian

See also
Sparta (disambiguation)
Spartacus (disambiguation)